Hickory Ridge High School is a comprehensive public high school in Harrisburg, North Carolina.  It became the sixth high school in the Cabarrus County Schools system when it opened on August 27, 2007. It has been designated by the North Carolina Board of Education an Honor School of Excellence, North Carolina's highest distinction, for 2008–2009, 2009–2010, and 2010–2011. It is one of only four traditional high schools in the state to receive this honor.

Student Body

The student body consists of students in grades 9–12, with about 350 students per grade. 2010–2011 was the first year without students from feeder high schools Jay M. Robinson High School and Central Cabarrus High School. For the 2015–2016 school year the enrollment was 1,655.

The Class of 2009 was the first graduating class of Hickory Ridge High School.
The Class of 2018 was the largest graduating class of Hickory Ridge High School.

References

External links

 Hickory Ridge HS Official Website
 Hickory Ridge HS Official Twitter

Schools in Cabarrus County, North Carolina
Public high schools in North Carolina
Educational institutions established in 2007
2007 establishments in North Carolina